Stephen Deas, born in 1968 in Southeast England, is an English fantasy author. He is most famous for his fantasy opus, the Memory of Flames sequence, set in a fantasy world inhabited by dragons.

Biography
Deas was raised in a town full of army veterans. He has a bachelor's degree in theoretical physics at Cambridge University and had a job at BAE Systems, doing "mathsy stuff". He now lives in Essex, writes full-time, and is married and has two children, Christopher Raphael Deas and Evan Alexander Deas.

Works

Memory of Flames
 The Adamantine Palace (2009)
 The King of the Crags (2010)
 The Order of the Scales (2011)

Thief-Taker's Apprentice 
 The Thief-Taker's Apprentice (2010)
 The Warlock's Shadow (2011)
 The King's Assassin (2012)

Silver Kings 
 Dragon Queen (2013)
 The Splintered Gods (2014)
The Black Mausoleum (2012)
 The Silver Kings (2015)

Dominion

 The Moonsteel Crown (2021)
 The House of Cats and Gulls (2022)
 Herald of the Black Moon (coming in 2023)

(As SK Sharp) 
 I Know What I Saw (2020)

(As Sam Peters) 
 From Darkest Skies (2017)
 From Distant Stars (2018)
 From Divergent Suns (2019)

(As Nathan Hawke) 
 The Crimson Shield (2013)
 Cold Redemption (2013)
 The Last Bastion (2013)

(As Gavin Deas, SF collaborations with SF author Gavin Smith)
 Elite: Wanted (2014)
 Empires: Infiltration (2014)
 Empires: Extraction (2014)

(As Sapper)
 Bulldog Drummond, Dead Man's Gate (2014) 
 Bulldog Drummond and the Faceless Men
 Bulldog Drummond and the Jaguar Mask

(As S. J. Deas)
 The Royalist (2014)
 The Protector (2015)

References

External links
 
 Stephen Deas at Fantastic Fiction
 Nathan Hawke site

English fantasy writers
1968 births
Living people
Alumni of the University of Cambridge
People from Writtle